Mendeleyevo is a rural locality (a settlement) and the administrative center of Mendeleyevskoye Rural Settlement, Karagaysky District, Perm Krai, Russia. The population was 3,169 as of 2010. There are 57  streets.

Geography 
Mendeleyevo is located 12 km south of Karagay (the district's administrative centre) by road. Savino is the nearest rural locality.

References 

Rural localities in Karagaysky District